Protobothrops jerdonii xanthomelas is a venomous pit viper subspecies endemic to China.

Description

The scalation includes 21-23 rows of dorsal scales at midbody, 176-188 ventral scales, 54-67 subcaudal scales, and 7-8 supralabial scales.

Geographic range
Found in Central and southern China, in the provinces of Henan, Shaanxi, Gansu, Sichuan, Guizhou, Hubei, and Guangxi. The type locality given is "Ichang" (=Yichang Shi, Hubei, China).

See also
 List of crotaline species and subspecies
 Snakebite

References

Further reading
 Günther, A. 1889. Third Contribution to our Knowledge of Reptiles and Fishes from the Upper Yangtsze-Kiang. Ann. Mag. Nat. Hist., Sixth Series, 4 (21): 218–229. (Trimeresurus xanthomelas, pp. 219, 221–222).

External links

 . Accessed 8 September 2008.
 . Accessed 8 September 2008.
 . Accessed 8 September 2008.

 jerdonii xanthomelas
Endemic fauna of China
Reptiles of China
Taxa named by Albert Günther
Reptiles described in 1889